Jodel Harold Oluwafemi Dossou (born 17 March 1992) is a Beninese professional footballer who plays as a midfielder for Ligue 2 club Sochaux and the Benin national team.

Career
In August 2020, Dossou joined Ligue 2 club Clermont Foot from Austrian Bundesliga side TSV Hartberg.

In January 2023, Dossou signed for Sochaux on a contract until June 2025.

Career statistics

Scores and results list Benin's goal tally first, score column indicates score after each Dossou goal.

Honours
Red Bull Salzburg
Austrian Bundesliga: 2013–14

FC Vaduz
Liechtenstein Football Cup: 2018–19

References

1992 births
Living people
People from Collines Department
Association football midfielders
Beninese footballers
Benin international footballers
Tunisian Ligue Professionnelle 1 players
2. Liga (Austria) players
Swiss Challenge League players
Austrian Football Bundesliga players
Ligue 2 players
Ligue 1 players
Tonnerre d'Abomey FC players
Club Africain players
FC Red Bull Salzburg players
FC Liefering players
SC Austria Lustenau players
FC Vaduz players
Expatriate footballers in Liechtenstein
TSV Hartberg players
Clermont Foot players
FC Sochaux-Montbéliard players
2019 Africa Cup of Nations players
Expatriate footballers in Tunisia
Beninese expatriate sportspeople in Tunisia
Expatriate footballers in Austria
Beninese expatriate sportspeople in Austria
Expatriate footballers in France
Beninese expatriate sportspeople in France
Beninese expatriate sportspeople in Liechtenstein